Egelsee or Egelmösli is a lake in the City of Berne, Switzerland. The lake is part of a park that stretches to the Paul Klee Zentrum. In some years, it freezes sufficiently to allow ice skating.

External links
Wysslochpark 
Natureisbahn Egelmösli

Lakes of Switzerland
Geography of Bern
Lakes of the canton of Bern